Leptolalax nahangensis (Nahang Asian toad) is a frog species in the family Megophryidae. It is endemic to Tuyên Quang Province, northern Vietnam. Its natural habitats are subtropical moist lowland forests, rivers, and caves. Its status is insufficiently known. This species has only been found near the entrance to a cave in Na Hang Nature Reserve.

Description
Leptolalax nahangensis is a large-sized Leptolalax: male measures  in snout-vent length. Its back is lavender-brown with large, irregular mottling and sides have large spots. It has golden irises, described as "piercing gold".

References

nahangensis
Amphibians of Vietnam
Endemic fauna of Vietnam
Amphibians described in 1998
Taxonomy articles created by Polbot
Taxobox binomials not recognized by IUCN